Pentila picena, the western cream pentila, is a butterfly in the family Lycaenidae. It is found in Ivory Coast, Ghana, Togo, Benin, Nigeria and possibly Cameroon (the Obudu area). The habitat consists of forests.

Adults feed on extrafloral nectaries on tendrils, including bamboo nectaries.

Subspecies
Pentila picena picena (Ivory Coast, Ghana)
Pentila picena catori Bethune-Baker, 1906 (central Nigeria)
Pentila picena cydaria (Grose-Smith, 1898) (Ghana, southern and western Nigeria)

References

Butterflies described in 1874
Poritiinae
Butterflies of Africa
Taxa named by William Chapman Hewitson